Psorosa dahliella is a species of snout moth. It is found in France, Spain, Portugal, Switzerland, Italy, Slovakia, Hungary, Croatia, Bosnia and Herzegovina, Romania, Bulgaria, North Macedonia, Greece, Ukraine and Russia.

Etymology
The species is named for the German entomologist Georg Dahl.

References

Moths described in 1832
Phycitini
Moths of Europe
Moths of Asia